The 8th Race of Champions was a non-Championship motor race, run to Formula One rules, held on 18 March 1973 at Brands Hatch circuit in Kent, UK. The race included several entrants in Formula 5000 cars and was won by Peter Gethin in a Chevron-Chevrolet B24 '72-05'. This was the only race other than the poorly-attended 1969 Madrid Grand Prix in which a Formula 5000 car beat a Formula One car.

Qualifying
Note: a blue background indicates a Formula 5000 entrant.

Classification
Note: a blue background indicates a Formula 5000 entrant.

References

External links
 Results at Silhouet.com 
 Results at ultimateracinghistory.com 

Race of Champions
Race of Champions (Brands Hatch)
Gold
Race of Champions